Grabica  is a village in Piotrków County, Łódź Voivodeship, in central Poland. It is the seat of the gmina (administrative district) called Gmina Grabica.

The village has an approximate population of 390.

References

Villages in Piotrków County